The 2021–22 UMass Lowell River Hawks men's basketball team represented the University of Massachusetts Lowell in the 2021–22 NCAA Division I men's basketball season. They played their home games at the Costello Athletic Center in Lowell, Massachusetts and were led by ninth-year head coach Pat Duquette. They finished the season 15-16, 7-11 in America East Play to finish in 7th place. They lost in the quarterfinals of the America East tournament to UMBC.

Previous season
In a season limited due to the ongoing COVID-19 pandemic, the River Hawks finished the 2020–21 season 	11–12, 7–8 in America East play to finish in sixth place. They fell to Hartford in the America East Conference Championship.

Roster

Schedule and results

|-
!colspan=12 style=| Non-conference regular season

|-
!colspan=12 style=| America East regular season

|-
!colspan=12 style=| America East tournament

Source

References

UMass Lowell River Hawks men's basketball seasons
UMass Lowell River Hawks
2021 in sports in Massachusetts
2022 in sports in Massachusetts